Prima may refer to:
 Prima, a French women's magazine
 Prima (news agency), a human rights news agency in Moscow
 Prima (locomotive), a locomotive type by Alstom
 Place of the Relevant Intermediary Approach, a legal doctrine applied in cross-border security transactions
 Prima TV, a Romanian television channel
 TV Prima, a Czech televisions  channel
 Prima BioMed, a public biotechnology company traded on the ASX and Nasdaq
 Prima Games, a publishing company of video game strategy guides
 Astro Prima Malaysian pay-TV channel
 Prima, an instrument of the Balalaika family
 Prima a female opera vocal released for Vocaloid 2
 Prima zmrzlina, a Czech ice cream
 Apco Prima, an Israeli paraglider design
 Prima (spider), a genus of spiders
 A musical unison
 PRImA, the Pattern Recognition & Image Analysis Research Lab of University of Salford, Manchester

People with the name 
 Leon Prima (1907–1985), an American jazz trumpeter, brother of Louis
 Louis Prima (1910–1978), a jazz musician, brother of Leon

In fiction 
 Prima (Transformers), an Autobot leader in Transformers
 Prima or Lorelei, a member of the Elite Four in Pokémon
 PRIMA, a fictional machine in Are You Afraid of the Dark? by Sidney Sheldon
 Prima Doll, a 2020 Japanese multimedia project

See also 
 Microgaming or Prima Poker, an online poker company
 Primus (disambiguation)
 Prime (disambiguation)
 Primer (disambiguation)
 Priam (disambiguation)

Surnames of Breton origin